The College of Professional Studies and Fine Arts (PSFA) is an academic unit of San Diego State University in San Diego, California.

Academics

Departments 
The College of Professional Studies and Fine Arts includes several academic departments:
 Aerospace Studies (AFROTC)
 Art and Design
 City Planning
 Child & Family Development
 Communication
 Criminal Justice
 Exercise & Nutritional Sciences
 The L. Robert Payne School of Hospitality and Tourism Management
 International Security and Conflict Resolution
 Journalism & Media Studies (JMS)
 Military Science (ROTC)
 Music & Dance
 Naval Science (NROTC)
 Public Administration & Urban Studies
 Recreation, Parks and Tourism
 Theatre, Television and Film

Special programs

Institutes/Research Centers 
 Berman Institute for Effective Communication
 Institute for Built Environment and Comparative Urban Research (BECUR)
 Center for Hospitality and Tourism Research
 International Center for Communications
 Institute for International Security and Conflict Resolution (ISCOR)
 Institute for Leisure Behavior
 Institute for Meetings and Events
 Institute of Public and Urban Affairs
 Institute for Surf Research
 Center for Visual and Performing Arts
 Center for Optimal Health and Performance
 Sycuan Institute on Tribal Gaming

Specialized libraries 
 Audio / Visual Library

Facilities 
 University Art Gallery
 Don Powell Theatre at the Performing Arts Plaza
 The Experimental Theatre
 J. Dayton Smith Recital Hall
 The Production Center for Documentary and Drama

See also
 San Diego State University

References

External links
 

P
Art schools in California
Film schools in California
Music schools in California
Hospitality schools in the United States
Public administration schools in the United States